The 2010 Newcastle Knights season was the 23rd in the club's history. Coached by Rick Stone and captained by Kurt Gidley, they competed in the National Rugby League's 2010 Telstra Premiership, finishing the regular season 11th (out of 16), failing to reach the finals.

Newcastle's captain, Kurt Gidley was also selected to captain New South Wales throughout the mid-season 2010 State of Origin series.

References

Newcastle Knights seasons
Newcastle Knights season